Chamaeleo caroliquarti is an extinct species of chameleon from Lower Miocene-aged strata of the Czech Republic.  C. caroliquarti is the oldest known representative of Chamaeleo, and, if the middle Paleocene-aged Anqingosaurus is not a chameleon, the oldest known chameleon.

References

†
Miocene lepidosaurs
Miocene reptiles of Europe
Fossil taxa described in 1980